The Blackwater Limestone is a geologic formation in Northern Ireland. It preserves fossils dating back to the Carboniferous period.

See also

 List of fossiliferous stratigraphic units in Northern Ireland

References
 

Carboniferous Northern Ireland
Carboniferous southern paleotropical deposits